Calophyllum rufinerve is a species of flowering plant in the Calophyllaceae family. It is found only living in the wild in West Papua in Indonesia.

References

rufinerve
Flora of Western New Guinea
Vulnerable plants
Taxonomy articles created by Polbot